Lassana Faye (born 15 June 1998) is a Dutch professional footballer who plays as a left back for Canadian Premier League side York United.

Early life
Faye was born in Rotterdam, Netherlands. He began playing youth football with Spartaan '20, after which he joined the youth system of Sparta Rotterdam. At age 13, he joined  PSV Eindhoven youth teams, before moving to the youth system of Vitesse in December 2015.

Club career
He made his senior debut with Jong Vitesse on August 13, 2016 in the third tier Tweede Divisie FC Lienden. He made his first team debut with Vitesse on 14 December 2016 in a KNVB Cup match against CVV de Jodan Boys. He won the 2016–17 KNVB Cup with the club. After declining to sign a new contract in the summer of 2018, Vitesse picked up an option on his contract for another season, but demoted him back to the second team, with the team seeking to find a transfer for him.

On 30 January 2019, he joined Sparta Rotterdam of the Eerste Divisie, helping them earn promotion to the Eredivisie for the following season. In April 2020, he extended his contract with the club for another season.

In September 2020, he went on loan to fellow Eredivisie club ADO Den Haag.

In February 2022, he signed with Ukrainian Premier League club Rukh Lviv. However, he was unable to appear for the club as the season was cancelled due to the 2022 Russian invasion of Ukraine, which forced him to flee the country, soon after signing.

In December 2022, he signed a one-year contract for the 2023 season with a club option for a further year with Canadian Premier League club York United.

International career
Faye was born in the Netherlands to a Senegalese father and Cape Verdean mother.

In March 2018, he was called up to the Netherlands U20 team for a friendly against the Czech Republic U20.

In February 2018, he stated it would be a dream of his to represent Senegal internationally. He has also been approached by the Cape Verdean Football Federation about representing the Cape Verde national team. In 2017, he was approached by the Senegalese Football Federation to represent the Senegal U20 team at the 2017 FIFA U-20 World Cup, but he was forced to decline the invitation, as his club team chose to not release him.

Career statistics

Honours

Club
Vitesse
 KNVB Cup: 2016–17

References

External links 
 

1998 births
Living people
Footballers from Rotterdam
Dutch footballers
Dutch expatriate footballers
Netherlands youth international footballers
Dutch people of Senegalese descent
Dutch sportspeople of Cape Verdean descent
Association football defenders
SBV Vitesse players
Sparta Rotterdam players
ADO Den Haag players
FC Rukh Lviv players
Eredivisie players
Eerste Divisie players
Tweede Divisie players
Expatriate footballers in Ukraine
Dutch expatriate sportspeople in Ukraine
York United FC players